The 1888 North Canterbury earthquake occurred at  on 1 September following a sequence of foreshocks that started the previous evening, and whose epicentre was in the North Canterbury region of the South Island of New Zealand.

The magnitude of the earthquake is estimated to be in the range 7.0–7.3. Severe damage to farm buildings in the epicentral region was reported and the top  of the spire of ChristChurch Cathedral collapsed. It was the first earthquake observed to be associated with mainly horizontal fault displacement.

Tectonic setting

New Zealand lies along the boundary between the Australian and Pacific Plates.

In the South Island, most of the relative displacement between these plates is taken up along a single dextral (right lateral) strike-slip fault with a major reverse component, the Alpine Fault.

In the North Island, displacement is mainly taken up along the Kermadec-Tonga subduction zone, although the remaining dextral strike-slip component is accommodated by the North Island Fault System.

Earthquake

The earthquake occurred on the Hope Fault, one of the group of dextral strike-slip structures known as the Marlborough Fault System that transfer displacement between the mainly transform and convergent type plate boundaries in a complex zone at the northern end of South Island. Alexander McKay, a geologist working for the geological survey, observed horizontal offsets in farm fences between  along the fault. He was the first to associate a strike-slip displacement with an earthquake.

Damage

In the North Canterbury region many buildings were severely damaged, particularly in the Hope Valley and Hanmer areas.

In Christchurch, the top  of the Cathedral spire fell down and minor damage, such as broken chimneys, affected many houses. The Durham Street Methodist Church, Christchurch's first church build with permanent materials, suffered some damage to its stonework. Another building affected was the Christchurch Normal School, where chimneys fell down and ceilings were cracked.

Damage was greatest in the northern and northwestern suburbs, probably due to the peaty sub-soil.

One person died of a heart attack during the earthquake.

See also
1848 Marlborough earthquake
1901 Cheviot earthquake
2013 Lake Grassmere earthquake
2013 Seddon earthquake
2016 Kaikōura earthquake
List of earthquakes in New Zealand
List of historical earthquakes

References

Earthquakes in New Zealand
North Canterbury Earthquake, 1888
North Canterbury, New Zealand
History of Canterbury, New Zealand
September 1888 events
1888 disasters in New Zealand